The Alssund Bridge (Danish: Alssundbroen) is a  girder bridge that carries Highway 8 across the Alssund north of Sønderborg, Denmark. Constructed between 1978 and 1981, it was officially opened on 19 October 1981 by Queen Ingrid.

References

Bridges in Denmark
Beam bridges in Denmark
Road bridges in Denmark
Bridges completed in 1981
1981 establishments in Denmark